Hamburg, Virginia may refer to:

Hamburg, Page County, Virginia
Hamburg, Shenandoah County, Virginia